I Won't Come Back is a 2014 Russian/Kazakh drama film directed by Ilmar Raag.
The film received a special jury mention in the Nora Ephron prize at the Tribeca Film Festival and won the Mirror Award at the Andrei Tarkovsky International Film Festival.

Plot
Anya is a graduate student who is implicated in a drugs bust after a visit from an old friend and runs from the police sent to arrest her. Due to her youthful looks, she poses as a homeless teenager and allows herself to be taken to an orphanage. Here, she meets Kristina, a 12-year old street-smart but troubled girl. When Anya runs away from the orphanage, Kristina follows her and talks her into traveling to her grandmother's village in Kazakhstan. Along the way, Anya gradually assumes responsibility for the younger girl.

Cast 
 Polina Pushkaruk - Anya
 Vika Lobacheva - Kristina
 Andrey Astrakhantsev - Andrey Lucius

References

External links 

2014 films
2010s drama road movies
2010s coming-of-age drama films
Russian drama road movies
Russian coming-of-age drama films
2010s Russian-language films
2014 drama films
Films scored by Panu Aaltio